Eugenio Horacio Isnaldo (born 7 January 1994) is an Argentine footballer who plays as a left winger for Atlético Tucumán.

Club career
On 19 July 2017, Asteras Tripolis officially announced the acquisition of the Argentinian winger on a three years' contract for an undisclosed fee.

References

External links
 

1994 births
Living people
Argentine footballers
Association football midfielders
Newell's Old Boys footballers
Asteras Tripolis F.C. players
Defensa y Justicia footballers
Unión La Calera footballers
Esporte Clube Bahia players
Atlético Tucumán footballers
Argentine Primera División players
Super League Greece players
Chilean Primera División players
Campeonato Brasileiro Série A players
Argentine expatriate footballers
Argentine expatriate sportspeople in Chile
Argentine expatriate sportspeople in Greece
Argentine expatriate sportspeople in Brazil
Expatriate footballers in Chile
Expatriate footballers in Greece
Expatriate footballers in Brazil
Footballers from Rosario, Santa Fe